In the U.S. state of Ohio, the common law felony murder rule has been effectively abolished in most situations through the enactment of Ohio's involuntary manslaughter statute. Still, a defendant can be convicted of murder in Ohio under the felony murder rule if someone dies as a result of the defendant committing an "offense of violence" that is a first or second degree felony.

References

U.S. state criminal law
Murder in Ohio
Ohio law